James Austin Scott (born December 10, 1969) is an American politician who has been the U.S. representative for  since 2011. The district stretches down the middle of the state, from just outside Macon to the Florida border. Scott served as a Republican member of the Georgia House of Representatives before being elected to the U.S. House.

Early life, education, and career
Scott's father, Jim, is an orthopedic surgeon and his mother, Becky, is a teacher in the public school system. Scott graduated from the University of Georgia with a B.B.A. in risk management and insurance. He passed the Series 7 Exam.

Scott is president of the Southern Group, LLC and a partner in Lockett Station Group, LLC.

Georgia Legislature
Scott was first elected to the Georgia House of Representatives at the age of 26. He chaired the Governmental Affairs Committee and served on the Appropriations, Rules, and Ways and Means Committee, where he chaired the Public Policy Subcommittee. The district he represented comprises Tift and Turner Counties.

In 2001, Scott was the first Republican in the Georgia House to work with Democrats to remove the Confederate battle emblem from the state's flag.

U.S. House of Representatives

Elections

2010

With millions of dollars in campaign donations from national PACs, Scott challenged Democratic incumbent Jim Marshall in Georgia's 8th congressional district. He defeated Marshall in the November 2 general election with 53% of the vote to Marshall's 47%.

Scott originally planned to campaign for governor of Georgia, announcing his campaign in January 2009. He made headlines for walking more than 1,000 miles around the state in his "Walk of Georgia", introducing a bill to abolish tolls on Georgia 400 and leading the charge in pressuring Georgia State Attorney General Thurbert Baker to file suit against the federal government over the controversial health care reform bill passed in March 2010. In April 2010, Scott withdrew from the race for governor to run for Congress.

In 2010, Scott signed a pledge sponsored by Americans for Prosperity promising to vote against any global warming legislation that would raise taxes.

2012

During his first term, Scott represented a fairly compact district in the center of the state, from Macon to Moultrie.

Redistricting after the 2010 census made the 8th somewhat more secure for Scott. Notably, a large chunk of the district's black residents were drawn into the neighboring 2nd district. This included most of Macon and surrounding Bibb County (except for a sliver in the north); Macon had been the heart of the 8th and its predecessors for more than a century. To make up for the loss of population, the General Assembly pushed the 8th all the way to the Florida border, adding Thomasville and most of Valdosta from the old 2nd. The old 8th already had a significant Republican lean, with a Cook Partisan Voting Index of R+10. The new 8th had a CPVI of R+15, making it the 11th most Republican district in the Eastern Time Zone and one of the most Republican districts in the country.

Scott was unopposed in both the primary and general elections.

2014

Scott was unopposed for a third term.

2016

In 2016, Scott faced a Democratic opponent for the first time since his initial run for the seat, private investigator James Neal Harris. Scott defeated Harris with 67.6% of the vote, carrying every county in the district.

2018

Scott was unopposed for a fifth term.

2020

On June 9, Scott defeated his Republican primary opponents, Vance Dean and Danny Ellyson, with 89.81% of the vote. For only the second time since his initial run for the seat, he faced a Democratic challenger, Lindsay Holliday. Scott defeated Holliday with 64.52% of the vote in the November 3 general election.

Tenure

Scott was selected by his colleagues as freshman class president for the 112th Congress.

National security and defense

Scott's district is home to two United States Air Force bases: Moody Air Force Base and Robins Air Force Base. As a senior member of the House Armed Services Committee, Scott supports pro-military and defense spending policies. He is also a proponent of the United States Navy hospital ships.

Scott was very vocal on the United States Air Force's decision not to replace the Northrop Grumman E-8 Joint STARS, which provide intelligence, surveillance, and reconnaissance capabilities. Many JSTARS are based at Robins Air Force Base in Warner Robins, Georgia. While Scott supports the forthcoming Advanced Battle Management System, or ABMS, he contends the Air Force should maintain the capabilities of the JSTARS until the new ABMS systems are in place. In 2018, the Air Force announced that Robins Air Force Base would host the initial elements of the Advanced Battle Management System, a capability which will fuse global air and space intelligence, surveillance, and reconnaissance information.

Scott opposed canceling the F-22.

As a member of the House Armed Services Committee, Scott works toward combating transnational criminal organizations and the international flow of drugs.

Scott served on the Conference Committees for the Fiscal Year 2018, Fiscal Year 2019, and Fiscal Year 2021 National Defense Authorization Acts.

For the 117th Congress, Scott is the only member from Georgia to serve on a Congressional defense committee.

Agriculture

Scott served on the Conference Committees for both the 2014 and 2018 Farm Bills.

Scott secured provisions in the 2018 Farm Bill to bring broadband investments to rural America.

In August 2020, U.S. Trade Representative Robert Lighthizer held two virtual hearings to examine foreign trade policies harming American growers of seasonal and perishable produce, including one with Georgia producers. These hearings were the result of years of requests by Scott and other members of Georgia's and Florida's Congressional delegations to examine the dumping of foreign-subsidized fresh fruits and vegetables into U.S. agricultural markets below the cost of production domestically.

Scott unsuccessfully ran against Representatives Rick Crawford and Glenn Thompson for Ranking Member of the House Agriculture Committee for the 117th Congress. Thompson, senior to Scott on the committee, was named Ranking Member by the Steering and Policy Committees of the United States House of Representatives in December 2020.

Legislation

On June 15, 2018, President Donald Trump signed into law the Veterans Cemetery Benefit Correction Act (Public Law No: 115-184), a bill authored by Scott and supported in the United States Senate by Johnny Isakson to require the Department of the Interior to provide outer burial receptacles for veterans' remains buried in a national cemetery administered by the National Park Service.

Scott and Representative Sanford Bishop brokered federal assistance for farmers affected by 2018 and 2019 natural disasters, including $3 billion in agricultural relief for damages from storms and reprogrammed unused funds to be used for future relief efforts. This was included in a disaster assistance package Trump signed into law in June 2019.

As a member of the Congressional Sportsmen's Caucus, Scott has sponsored and supported numerous sportsmen's and conservation bills. In the 115th Congress, he introduced legislation to modernize the Pittman–Robertson Federal Aid in Wildlife Restoration Act to allow state fish and wildlife agencies to use Pittman-Robertson funds for public relations and for constructing, operating, and maintaining public ranges, which passed the House during the 115th Congress.

Current committee assignments

 Committee on Agriculture
 Subcommittee on General Farm Commodities and Risk Management (Ranking Member)
 Subcommittee on Commodity Exchanges, Energy, and Credit
 Subcommittee on Biotechnology, Horticulture, and Research
 Committee on Armed Services
 Subcommittee on Readiness
 Subcommittee on Intelligence and Special Operations

Caucus memberships 
 Republican Study Committee
 Congressional Sportsmen's Caucus (former co-chair and House vice chair)
 Congressional Cement Caucus
United States Congressional International Conservation Caucus

Other memberships
 NATO Parliamentary Assembly
 Board of Visitors, Western Hemisphere Institute for Security Cooperation

Stock trades 

Scott has been a successful stock trader while serving in Congress. He bought 1,000 shares of Fuel Cell Energy, Inc. (FCEL) at $2 per share on October 30, 2020, and sold some shares on December 23, 2020, at $13.42 (a 571% increase), selling the remainder on January 14, 2021, at $17.60 (a 780% increase). The website Unusual Whales follows congressional stock trading and has created a page for Scott's trades.

Political positions

Abortion

Scott opposes abortion and believes that human life begins at conception.

Budget, taxes, and the economy

Scott is in favor of a balanced budget amendment. He voted for the Tax Cuts and Jobs Act of 2017.

Cannabis

Scott has a "D" rating from marijuana legalization advocacy organization the National Organization for the Reform of Marijuana Laws (NORML) for his voting history regarding cannabis-related issues.

Capital punishment

Scott is in favor of capital punishment.

LGBT issues

Scott opposes same-sex marriage and is in favor of a Federal Marriage Amendment.

Second Amendment

He opposes gun control.

Women's issues

Scott voted against the 2013 renewal of the Violence Against Women Act.

Texas v. Pennsylvania

In December 2020, Scott was one of 126 Republican members of the House of Representatives to sign an amicus brief in support of Texas v. Pennsylvania, a lawsuit filed at the United States Supreme Court contesting the results of the 2020 presidential election, in which Joe Biden defeated incumbent Donald Trump. The Supreme Court declined to hear the case on the basis that Texas lacked standing under Article III of the Constitution to challenge the results of an election held by another state.

2021 Electoral College vote

On January 7, 2021, Scott did not object to the Electoral College certification in the House of Representatives. On January 5, 2021, he joined several Republican colleagues in sending a letter to Congressional leadership stating that members of Congress did not have the authority to object to Electoral College votes sent to them by each state absent an investigation from a state legislature or a conflicting slate of electors.

Scott condemned the violence at the U.S. Capitol on January 6, 2021.

Scott attended President Joe Biden's inauguration on January 20, 2021.

Confederate names 
On February 12, 2021, Scott was appointed to the Congressionally mandated Commission on the Naming of Items of the Department of Defense that Commemorate the Confederate States of America or Any Person Who Served Voluntarily with the Confederate States of America.

Personal life
Austin and his wife, Vivien, reside in Tifton, Georgia, with their three children. The Scotts are members of First Baptist Church of Tifton.

References

External links

 Congressman Austin Scott official U.S. House website
 Austin Scott for Congress
 
 
 

|-

|-

|-

|-

1969 births
21st-century American politicians
Baptists from Georgia (U.S. state)
Baptists from the United States
Living people
Republican Party members of the Georgia House of Representatives
People from Tifton, Georgia
Politicians from Augusta, Georgia
Republican Party members of the United States House of Representatives from Georgia (U.S. state)
University of Georgia alumni
American gun rights activists